Solatopupa guidoni is a species of air-breathing land snail, a terrestrial pulmonate gastropod mollusk in the family Chondrinidae. 

Subspecies
 Solatopupa guidoni guidoni (Caziot, 1904)
 Solatopupa guidoni simonettae (Giusti, 1970)

Distribution
This species is found in France and Italy.

References

 Gittenberger, E. (1973). Beiträge zur Kenntnis der Pupillacea. III. Chondrininae. Zoologische Verhandelingen, 127: 1-267, pl. 1-7. Leiden
 Bank, R. A.; Neubert, E. (2017). Checklist of the land and freshwater Gastropoda of Europe. Last update: July 16th, 2017

Chondrinidae
Gastropods described in 1903
Taxonomy articles created by Polbot